Ada Apa dengan Cinta? (English: What's Up with Love?) is a 2014 Indonesian short film directed by Mira Lesmana. The short was published by Japanese chatting application LINE, as a promotional media for the "Find Alumni" feature. It serves as a continuation of the 2002 Indonesian hit teen romance Ada Apa dengan Cinta?. The short was released on YouTube by LINE's official channel on November 6, 2014. As of February 2016, the short film had gained over 6 million viewers.

With the release of Ada Apa Dengan Cinta? 2 in 2016, this short film is no longer canonical to the original movie.

Plot
It's been 12 years after Rangga (Nicholas Saputra) left Jakarta for New York City. Now a successful reporter, he received a short notice that he has to go to Bangkok and then Jakarta. After seeing an old Indonesian classic literature book he used to read, he remembers his high school lover Cinta (Dian Sastrowardoyo). Using LINE's find alumni feature, he contacts Cinta.

In Jakarta, Cinta, now works in a magazine company, meets up with her high school gang that consists of Karmen (Adinia Wirasti), Maura (Titi Kamal), Milly (Sissy Priscillia), and Alya (Ladya Cheryl). Cinta tell the ladies that Rangga contacted her, much to everyone's surprise. To their disappointment, Rangga does not use his photo as a profile picture. After being confused on what to say, Cinta ask him what's up with him. He ask her to meet him, which she didn't respond. Maura supports her decision as she think what he's done by showing up after 12 years being gone just isn't right. Alya, however, is the only one who realize that Cinta is torn inside (just as Alya is the only one knew Cinta likes Rangga in the original film).

Cinta then decides to delete all of Rangga's messages. Rangga, disappointed, text her an apology. He has to return to the U.S. and are about to board his plane, but what ends in the airport also ends in the airport. Cinta suddenly appears and ask him if a full moon in New York is different from one in Jakarta (Rangga said that he will return in the next full moon in the first film). They approach each other and share a smile.

Cast
 Dian Sastrowardoyo as Cinta
 Nicholas Saputra as Rangga
 Ladya Cheryl as Alya
 Titi Kamal as Maura
 Sissy Priscillia as Milly
 Adinia Wirasti as Karmen

Release
The short film was released on November 6, 2014 on LINE Indonesia's official YouTube channel. LINE users can watch Ada Apa dengan Cinta? 2014 via broadcast message from the official LINE Indonesia account (LINE for iOS, LINE for Android, LINE for BlackBerry, or LINE for Windows Phone) by typing "AADC" in the message. The users will receive a link that redirect them to YouTube where LINE upload the promotional video. Besides YouTube, the short film premiered on Kompas TV on Sunday, November 9, 2014 at 20.30 WIB, after a telecast of Ada Apa dengan Cinta?.

Impact

The short's successful release prompt many people to express their excitement for an actual full length sequel. The short became an immediate trending topic on Twitter and gained 2½ million viewers on YouTube in just 2 days. This positive reception of the short proves that the 2002's cult classic teen romance remains popular in Indonesia. Finally, in March 2015, after months of speculations and rumours, Mira Lesmana the short's director and producer of Ada Apa Dengan Cinta? confirmed that a feature sequel is on the works that is slated to be released in April 2016.

References

2014 short films
2014 films
Indonesian short films